Carl Copping Plehn (January 20, 1867 – July 21, 1945) was an American economist. He was a professor of public finance at the University of California, Berkeley, from 1893 to 1937. In 1923, he served as the 25th president of the American Economic Association.

A native of Providence, Rhode Island, Plehn earned his bachelor's degree from Brown University in 1889. He then pursued graduate education at the University of Göttingen in Germany, graduating with a PhD in 1891.

References

External links

1867 births
1945 deaths
People from Providence, Rhode Island
Brown University alumni
University of Göttingen alumni
Middlebury College faculty
University of California, Berkeley faculty
Presidents of the American Economic Association
Economists from Rhode Island